2-deoxystreptamine glucosyltransferase (kanF (gene)) is an enzyme with systematic name UDP-alpha-D-glucose:2-deoxystreptamine 6-alpha-D-glucosyltransferase. This enzyme catalyses the following chemical reaction

 UDP-alpha-D-glucose + 2-deoxystreptamine  UDP + 2'-deamino-2'-hydroxyparomamine

This enzyme is involved in the biosynthesis of kanamycin B and kanamycin C.

References

External links 

EC 2.4.1